Neodymium acetylacetonate is a coordination compound of neodymium and acetylacetone, with the chemical formula Nd(O2C5H7)3(H2O)2, although some sources ignore the aquo ligands. It commonly occurs as a white powder. Its instablility constants (logYn) are 2.89, 4.15 and 5.26 (corresponding to n = 1, 2, 3). Its dihydrate reacts with carbonyl rhenium complex Re(CO)3X(4,4'-bipy) (X=Cl, Br) to obtain Re(CO)3X(4,4'-bipy)Nd(acac)3.

Preparation
Neodymium acetylacetonate can be obtained by reacting a lanthanum alkoxide with acetylacetone, or by electrolysis of neodymium in acetylacetone.

References

Acetylacetonate complexes
Neodymium compounds